Muslim Bagh (Pashto/),  is a town in Killa Saifullah District, Balochistan, Pakistan. According to the Census of 1998, the population of Muslim Bagh is 70,361 (male 37,303 and female 33,058), with 10,188 households.

Muslim Bagh was formerly called Hindu Bagh, which is believed to have originated in a garden there planted by a Hindu saint in ages past.

Notable people
Usman Khan Kakar
Arfa Siddiq

References

Populated places in Killa Saifullah District